Gerris marginatus is a species of water strider in the family Gerridae. It is found in Central America, North America, and South America.

References

External links

 

Articles created by Qbugbot
Insects described in 1832
Gerrini